Queen's Nympton or Queensnympton is a small civil parish in the North Devon district of Devon, England.  According to the 2001 census it had a population of 32.  There is no actual settlement by the name - the parish was originally an exclave of South Molton, but was split to form a separate civil parish in 1894.

From northwards clockwise, the parish borders George Nympton, Bishop's Nympton, Mariansleigh, and King's Nympton.

Notes

External links
 

Villages in Devon
Former exclaves